Hamadan Airbase   or Shahrokhi Airbase or Noje Airbase is an Islamic Republic of Iran Air Force base located 47 km north of Hamadan in the Hamadān Province. The airbase is named after Captain Mohammad Noje who had become, on August 16, 1979, the first IRIAF pilot to be killed in action. The Nojeh coup plot took place there in 1980.

Russian Air Force use

Since 16 August 2016, the Russian Air Force′s Tupolev Tu-22M long-range bombers and Sukhoi Su-34 strike fighters have used the base for conducting raids over Syria as part of the Russia's military intervention into the Syrian conflict. The bombing missions support the Syrian Arab Army in operations against the Syrian opposition and the Islamic State. It is the first time Iran has let a foreign country use its territory for military operations since the 1979 Iranian Revolution.

Later in August 2016, Iran's minister of defense Hossein Dehghan clarified that Iran was hosting Russia′s aircraft at the request of the Syrian government and Russia was free to utilise it as long as it was necessary. The following day, on 21 August, he appeared to criticise Russia's actions as rash and self-aggrandizing and was quoted as saying, “Under no circumstances will we ever provide Russians with a military base. They have not come here to stay.” On 22 August 2016, Iran's foreign ministry spokesman said Russia would stop using the air base for Syria airstrikes "for the time being".

See also
 Nojeh coup plot
 List of longest runways

References

Iranian airbases
Buildings and structures in Hamadan Province